Psilocarphus tenellus is a species of flowering plant in the family Asteraceae known by the common names slender woollyheads and slender woolly marbles. It is native to western North America from far southwestern British Columbia to Baja California, where it grows in seasonally wet habitat, such as vernal pools, as well as coastline and disturbed areas.

Description
This is a small annual herb producing several stems a few centimeters long which are coated in thin to thick woolly fibers. The leaves are lance-shaped to oblong and under 2 centimeters in length. The inflorescence is a spherical flower head no more than half a centimeter wide. It is a cluster of several tiny woolly disc flowers surrounded by leaflike bracts but no phyllaries. Each tiny flower is covered in a scale which is densely woolly with long white fibers, making the developing head appear cottony.

External links
Jepson Manual Treatment
USDA Plants Profile
Flora of North America
Photo gallery

Gnaphalieae
Flora of the West Coast of the United States
Flora of British Columbia
Flora of Baja California
Flora of California
Flora of the Cascade Range
Flora of the Klamath Mountains
Flora of the Sierra Nevada (United States)
Natural history of the California chaparral and woodlands
Natural history of the California Coast Ranges
Natural history of the Central Valley (California)
Natural history of the Channel Islands of California
Natural history of the Peninsular Ranges
Natural history of the San Francisco Bay Area
Natural history of the Santa Monica Mountains
Natural history of the Transverse Ranges
Flora without expected TNC conservation status